Peter Busby (born 1952) is an architect and Managing Director at Perkins & Will Architects, with a background in philosophy and a history of advancing sustainable design. Throughout his career, he has advocated for sustainable building strategies and integrated green building infrastructure that serves to educate the users of his spaces.

Life and education 
Busby was born in Southport, Merseyside, UK on September 26, 1952. His father was a British engineer who emigrated to Canada and worked at Nortel in Toronto and New York. Busby's wife Catherine is an occupational therapist and they have four children. Busby holds a Bachelors of Arts in Political Philosophy from the University of Toronto where he graduated in 1974 to pursue a Bachelor of Architecture from the University of British Columbia in 1977. He received an Honorary Doctorate in Science from Ryerson University in 2008. Throughout his years studying philosophy, Busby worked summer jobs on construction sites, which included carpentry. Some notable professors included architectural historian Douglas Richardson of the University of Toronto, and UBC sustainability professor Raymond Cole.

Career 
Upon graduating, Busby apprenticed with Rhone & Iredale Architects in Vancouver, then with Norman Foster in London and Hong Kong, where he was a project architect at the age of 28. He also worked with Miller Hull. He started his own practice in Vancouver in 1984. As the sole practitioner at the time, he constructed 1216 Granville Street office, then located in a marginal neighborhood. Paul Bridger would join as partner in 1986 and the practice grew to 10 in 1992 and 45 by 2004. In 1987 Busby founded the product design firm Designlines and integrates industrial design into his architecture. His attitude towards design is defined by an industrious vision driven by a confidence that critic Adele Weder describes as necessary for making an impact in an industry of "sclerotic conventions." Weder points to the example of One Wall Centre Project, a 48-story tower which ignited conflicts between his client and the City of Vancouver, resulting in a dual toned glass envelope.

He leads his practice making architecture notably present in all contexts responding to the existing urban fabric. One of Busby's first jobs was a lab for MacMillan Bloedel, the forestry company that created parallel strand lumber (Parallam), the same material he would use for that project and further served as an inspiration for Busby to incorporate into his future projects. The practice led to the formation of Busby Bridger Architects in 1986 grew to Busby + Associates  which eventually collaborated with Perkins + Will in 2002 and merged for a strategic partnership in 2004. His team consists of researchers, biologists, and staff working towards issues he believes architecture should address. Their projects have received numerous design awards including six Governor General Awards, eleven British Columbia Lieutenant Governor Awards, and the Royal Architectural Institute of Canada's Firm of the Year Award. Busby often lectures on sustainability topics and green initiatives both nationally and internationally and is a founder of Leadership in Energy and Environmental Design (LEED) along with being a founding member of the Canada Green Building Council.

Design philosophy 
Busby's design philosophy of a synergy between architecture and nature is reinforced by the virtue of right and wrong garnered from his philosophy background.  He orchestrates the ideal building nested in a city that gives back energy rather than consuming; declaring peace with nature contributing to social responsibility. This manifesto is exemplified in the Center of Interactive Research on Sustainability (CIRS) and Van  Dusen Botanical Garden Visitor Center along with the multitude of projects using reclaimed building material and minimizing resource consumption; making the business case for sustainable design through reducing the cost of sustainable design moves and marketing with captivating graphics while demanding architects to collaborate with other disciplines. Busby employs this logic into his personal life, manifested through his off-grid Vancouver cabin powered by photo-voltaic cells, eight vertical axis wind turbines and a rainwater collection system to water the gardens. The row of vertical windows speak the language of his urban designs and maximizes the efficient use of light  and this handcrafted summer home displays his love of wood since the material embodies carbon along with providing the natural warmth and humanity evoked through the atmospheric qualities beyond the benefits sequestered as a building material. It is through education of the general public, AEC industry, along with clients that Busby believes should be the start of sustainable efforts. Busby then combines the accumulated experience of sustainable design with his business acumen to advocate for greener cities and in the past has not hesitated to work with developers such as Concorde or large retail chains like Wal-mart to forward sustainable design.

When designing industrial architecture, his design philosophy considers the building and environmental factors but also the intrapersonal impact that good designs can affect, he believes that it is this immediate environmental improvement that can yield higher productivity, product quality, and lower staff turnover rates. Busby's contributions to the EBCO Aerospace office in Delta, BC takes awareness of its proximity to transportation hubs, rail or waterways, labour pool, and lower price land to maximize economy. He believes that a full range of complementary services to healthily integrate the thousands of employed staff, providing amenities required for complete community services which include banks, cleaners, restaurants, daycare, and recreation; working inside out to provide better work environments. Currently at Perkins and Will, he has focused on the Regenerative Design approach where each operation in a building's construction is measured by its positive impact on human and natural systems. Supported by a research team of architects, engineers, and sustainability strategists within Perkins and Will, to concentrate the advancement of sustainable building practices.

Sustainability 
Busby's architectural career is primarily focused on sustainability to integrate building systems to foster user experience and improve the environment which it resides. His approach to architecture considers affordability, amenities, transportation, and social issues to be worked into given project briefs, backed by scientific and economic considerations that provide a business case for sustainability. On the CIRS project, majority of the heavy timber used are pine beetle reclaimed lumber that would have otherwise been disposed of. Busby studies the embodied energy of the material and its carbon footprint to processing prior to its installation, digging deep into the numbers that contribute to published statistics, a case example educating that a reduction in carbon emissions can be a result of offshoring operations, economic recession, or a reduction in price of an alternative energy source. Busby's strategic mindset in delivering his sustainable strategies are sometimes through working with developers and large retail chains, notably with Wal-mart whom adopted 20 of his 34 design suggestions throughout their stores during his proposal for the Vancouver store.

His career is dedicated to furthering sustainability through architectural practices via a range of strategies including the use of reclaimed and recycled building materials that are locally sourced, thus, reducing embodied carbon, majority of projects are designed with passive sustainability moves like building orientation, the tightening of building massing, and reduction in consumption prior to implementing active building systems such as integrated PV and geothermal heating and cooling. Through practicing and actively researching and educating along with public advocacy, Busby not only preaches but lives the life of sustainable design, through the encouragement of walking, mixed use developments around transit nodes, to reduce carbon footprint. This longstanding engagement with the complex factors contributing to sustainability as well as advocacy for the profession's role and potential in furthering sustainability goals is recounted in Busby: Learning Sustainable Design (2007).

Notable project contributions  
Center for Interactive Research on Sustainability (CIRS) Vancouver, British Columbia

Developed to be a model that adopts sustainable building technologies to influence future urban developments. This net positive research institution encourages interdisciplinary collaboration to operate beyond the scale of the building but also in relation to their larger contexts.

Van Dusen Botanical Garden Visitor Centre  Vancouver, British Columbia

Brentwood Station Burnaby, British ColumbiaCanada Line Stations Richmond, British Columbia

Riyadh Metro Prototype Stations Riyadh, Saudi Arabia

707 Terry Seattle, Washington

Canada's Earth Tower Vancouver, British Columbia

Perkins & Will Atlanta Studio Atlanta, Georgia

Lucile Packard Children's Hospital Stanford Palo Alto, California

Potrero Power Station San Francisco, California

Ottawa Confederation Line Ottawa, Ontario

Marine Gateway Vancouver, British Columbia

Brighthouse Elementary School Richmond, British Columbia.

Recognition 

 Canadian Green Building Council  
 LEED Fellow  
 Fellow, Cascadia Green Building Council  
 Member, Order of Canada  
 Fellow, Royal Architectural Institute of Canada 
 Founder, Board Member, and Chair, Canada Green Building Council

Publications 

 "Eight ways to inspire innovation in the business of architecture" Greenbiz. 13 February 2016 <www.greenbiz.com>
 Busby: Architecture's New Edges, Ecotone, 2015.
 Busby: Learning Sustainable Design, Janam Publications, 2007.
 "Perkins+Will Portfolio: A look at recent projects from the Vancouver, British Columbia, Canada, office of Perkins+Will, led by Peter Busby." Architect. 5 March 2012. <www.architectmag.com>
 "Is This the World's Greenest Neighborhood?" The Atlantic. 25 August 2011 <www.theatiantic.com>

Awards 

 Royal Architectural Institute of Canada (RAIC) Gold Medalist, 2014 
 Acterra Award for Sustainability, Business Environmental Awards, 2013 
 Wood WORKS! Awards, VanDusen Botanical Garden Visitor Center, 2013
 Lieutenant Governor of British Columbia Medal in Architecture 2012
 Samuel Brighouse Elementary School, Lieutenant Governor of British Columbia, Medal in Architecture, 2012
 Architectural Record's Schools of the 21st Century, Center for Interactive Research on Sustainability (CIRS), 2012 
 AIBC Innovation Award, 2012 
 Top 5 Project, Clean50, 2013 
 Canada's Greenest Employers, 2010, 2011, 2012 
 Firm Award - The Globe and Mail Laurentian University Living With Lakes Ecology Center 
 Regional Holcim Award Winner, Dockside Green, 2009 
 AIA COTE Top Ten Green Projects, 2009. 
 Globe Awards for Environmental Excellence, 2008. 
 Officer of the Order of Canada in 2005
 Honorary Doctorate from Ryerson University 2008

References 

1952 births
Living people
Canadian architects
University of Toronto alumni
Officers of the Order of Canada
People from West Yorkshire
University of British Columbia Faculty of Applied Science alumni